Enrum is a neighbourhood in the city of Kristiansand in Agder county, Norway. It is located in the borough of Grim and in the district of Grim. It is located north of Grimsmyra, east of Klappane and Paradis, and southwest of Ravnedalen. Idda Arena is an indoor iceskating hall and a gymnastic hall. Idda is near Grim Junior High and Solholmen Elementary.

References

Geography of Kristiansand
Neighbourhoods of Kristiansand